Kaw is a 2007 American made-for-television natural horror film directed by Sheldon Wilson, produced by Gordon Yang and written by Benjamin Sztajnkrycer. It was premiered on April 7, 2007 on the Sci Fi Channel. It is similar in plot to The Birds (1963) (which also starred Rod Taylor) and can be considered a modernization of the film.

Plot 

A shunned farmer attempts to warn his neighbors of an impending besiegement by crazed ravens, A small town sheriff and the trapped citizens of the town must band together to survive.

After one of the farmer's cows catches mad cow disease, it dies. Soon another cow catches it and dies as well. Instead of telling the authorities about it, the farmer chooses to keep quiet thinking he could handle the situation and for fear of the authorities killing his cattle. Ravens feed on the infected cow carcasses, and the disease begins to affect the birds as well.  The farmer tries to burn the corpses in hopes to drive the birds away. However, it only makes them angrier until they decided to attack the townspeople. The people fight over the birds in the movie.

Reception
Film review aggregator site Rotten Tomatoes does not have enough reviews of Kaw for a "Tomatometer" rating, but out of four reviews of the film, three are negative, with one noting "...it lacks true tension and certainly can't keep up with the shock value of its gore-filled horror contemporaries."

Cast
 Sean Patrick Flanery as Wayne
 Stephen McHattie as Clyde
 Kristin Booth as Cynthia
 Rod Taylor as Doc
 John Ralston as Oskar
 Michèle Duquet as Betty
 Ashley Newbrough as Doris
 Gray Powell as Stanley "Stan"
 Vladmir Bondarenko as Jacob
 Megan Park as Gretchen
 Emma Knight as Connie
 Amanda Brugel as Emma
 Wendy Lyon as Luanne
 Sophie Gendron as Tricia
 Jefferson Brown as John
 Renessa Blitz as Rachel
 David Gardner as Rolf
 Alexander Conti as Tyler Whitmore
 Jen Lawson as Tyler's Mother

References

External links 
 
Kaw, the official website.

Kaw at Rotten Tomatoes

2007 television films
2007 films
Horror films about birds
Syfy original films
2007 horror films
American horror television films
2000s English-language films
Films directed by Sheldon Wilson
2000s American films
Sony Pictures direct-to-video films